Fritz Walter (August 30, 1896 in Ohrdruf – April 1, 1977) was a German politician of  FDP.

1896 births
1977 deaths
People from Saxe-Coburg and Gotha
Free Democratic Party (Germany) politicians